() is a county of the prefecture-level city of Quanzhou, in southern Fujian province, People's Republic of China. It lies adjacent to and directly north of Xiamen.

Anxi is well known for a number of varieties of Oolong tea, the best-known of which is Tieguanyin (铁观音, "Iron Boddhisatva of Mercy"). Anxi Tieguanyin is classified as one of the Top 10 Chinese Tea.

Attractions
Qingshuiyan is a mountain hosting a very large Buddhist temple.

China Tea Capital is a large center dedicated to showcasing Anxi County's famous tieguanyin tea.

Administration
The county executive, legislature and judiciary are in Fengcheng Town, together with the CPC and PSB branches.

Towns
There are 13 towns in Anxi County:
 Penglai
 Hutou
 Fengcheng – the county seat
 Guanqiao
 Jiandou,
 Chengxiang
 Jingu
 Longmen
 Huqiu
 Lutian
 Gande
 Kuidou
 Xiping – home of the original Tieguanyin tea shrub

Townships
There are 11 townships in Anxi:
 Cannei Township
 Bailai Township
 Hushang Township
 Shangqing Township
 Daping Township
 Longjuan Township
 Changkeng Township
 Lantian Township
 Xianghua Township
 Taozhou Township
 Futian Township

Climate

Transportation 
The area was formerly served by Anxi railway station. In the future, it will be served by Anxi West railway station.

References

 
Quanzhou
County-level divisions of Fujian